The bearded miner bee (Andrena barbilabris) is a species of miner bee in the family Andrenidae. It is found in Europe and Northern Asia (excluding China) and North America. Other common names include the long-lipped andrena and the sandpit mining bee.

Description
The bearded miner bee is commonly around 11 mm in length, the males being smaller and slenderer than the females. The females have rufous hairs on the dorsal surface of the thorax which contrast with the yellower hairs on its sides and head. The males can appear silvery in colour because of the long pale hairs on their thorax. The integument is largely black. It has a narrow head which gives this species a rather hunch-backed appearance.

Distribution
The bearded miner bee has a Holarctic distribution, being found across North America in southern Canada and the northern United States. In Eurasia it is distributed from western Europe to Anatolia, into western and eastern Siberia to the Russian Far East in Yakutia and Primorsky Krai and in Japan. In Britain and Ireland it has a patchy, localised distribution as far north as Inverness, it is scarcer in Ireland. It also occurs on Guernsey and Jersey in the Channel Islands.

Habitat and ecology
The bearded miner bee has a strong association with light, sandy soils. The male and female bees emerge from their underground cells in the early Spring. Following emergence they mate and the females then search out sites to excavate their nesting burrows. In the burrow, the females dig out small cells within which they place a ball of pollen mixed with nectar. She then lays a single egg on each ball and seals it into its cell. The nest is not obvious and the female relies on her sense of scent to locate the nest. The nest is hidden under a thin layer of sand and the bee digs into the nest in a short time. The flight period of these bees is from March to July and they forage on a wide variety of flowers. Willows are their preferred plant for foraging on and they usually remain within 300m of their nests. These "solitary" bees form small aggregations of nests in loose sandy soil, even nesting between paving stones in gardens. Unlike other bees in the genus Andrena, the presence of the specialized cleptoparasitic bee from the genus Sphecodes, namely Sphecodes pellucidus often alerts the observer to the presence of its host as it digs into the sand, seeking out the nests of the Bearded Miner Bees.

References

Further reading

External links

 

barbilabris
Articles created by Qbugbot
Insects described in 1802
Taxobox binomials not recognized by IUCN